Golf World was a weekly magazine covering the game of golf published by Condé Nast. It was in circulation between 1947 and 2014. Currently, Golf World still available in digital form and from May 13, 2019 to April 8, 2022, the brand has been owned by Discovery, Inc.

History and profile 
The magazine was first published in 1947. It celebrated its 60th anniversary in 2007, and was therefore the oldest golf publication in the United States. It was purchased by The New York Times Company from Billian publishing, the original owners in 1988, who sold it to Condé Nast in 2001.

Golf World covers the game of golf, including the PGA Tour, LPGA Tour, Champions Tour, Nationwide Tour, European Tour, and amateur events around the United States and internationally. As a weekly, it is the only magazine that provides in-depth previews and coverage of all the major tournaments. Preview issues of majors have dedicated sections that can include pull-out course maps, lineups of players, comparative charts from years past, and articles about what has happened in history and what to expect in the coming week.  Coverage issues contain pull-out sections called "Rank and File" that provides in-depth analysis of players' performance in the past week's tournament. Also contained in the coverage issues are articles telling the stories of the week as well as stories about the tournament that do not usually make the news outlets, like breaking the story of Phil Mickelson changing coaches earlier in 2007 before Mickelson announced the change.

In July 2014, Golf World ceased its print edition for a digital-only edition. The final print edition cover, dated July 28, 2014, featured Rory McIlroy holding the Claret Jug after winning the 2014 Open Championship.

On May 13, 2019, Discovery, Inc. acquired Golf Digest (including Golf World) from Condé Nast in order expand into golf editorial media business.

References

External links 
 

Defunct Condé Nast magazines
Defunct magazines published in the United States
Warner Bros. Discovery brands
World
Magazines established in 1947
Magazines disestablished in 2014
Magazines formerly owned by Condé Nast
Magazines published in New York City
Online magazines published in the United States
Online magazines with defunct print editions
Sports magazines published in the United States
Weekly magazines published in the United States